Bacchisa unicoloripennis is a species of beetle in the family Cerambycidae. It was described by Breuning in 1964. It is from Laos.

References

U
Beetles described in 1964